The imbricate alligator lizard or transvolcanic alligator lizard (Barisia imbricata) is a species of medium-sized lizard in the family Anguidae. The species is endemic to Mexico.

References

Barisia
Reptiles of Mexico
Reptiles described in 1828
Taxa named by Arend Friedrich August Wiegmann